Surfer's knots are a cutaneous condition caused by chronic pressure over bony prominences leading to thick fibrotic nodules on knees, knuckles, dorsal feet, often seen with those who perform surfing, boxing, football, and marbles.

See also 
 Turf toe
 Tennis toe
 List of cutaneous conditions

References 

Skin conditions resulting from physical factors